The 2014–15 season was Al Ain Football Club's 41st in existence and the club's 39th consecutive season in the top-level football league in the UAE.

Season overview

June
On 10 June, Al Ain announced its first two signing of the season by reached an agreement with Pohang Steelers to get Lee Myung-Joo for a three-year deal and Rashed Eisa for a one-season loan from Al Wasl FC in exchange deal of joining Salem Abdullah and Hazza Salem for loan. On 23 June, Al Ain agreed a contract extension with Waleed Salem, keeping him with the club for three more years. On 26 June, Alex Brosque leaves the club and return to Sydney FC, has signed a two-season deal and was presented on 1 July.

July
 
On 3 July, Al Ain announce the signing of the Slovakian Miroslav Stoch from Fenerbahçe on one-year loan contract to become the third player joining the club. On 4 July, Team Supervisor, Mohammed Obeid Hammad, Stated that 20 players will leave the club, from the first team and most of them of the reserve team, after cancellation of the Reserve League and replaced by Under-21 Championship. Khaled and his younger brother Mohammed Abdulrahman signs a new extension 3 years with the club. Kembo Ekoko returned to the club after a one-year loan spell at the Qatari club El Jaish, also was called to join the club camp by Zlatko Dalić, to decide the 4th foreign player. On 9 July, Mohammed Salem became the third player loaned to Al Wasl FC, After Salem, Hazza. Sultan Nasser moved to promoted club Ittihad Kalba, for one season. Al Ain announce the signing of former Al Ahli Defender Mohammed Fawzi from Baniyas for three seasons along with the transfer of midfielder Bandar Al Ahbabi and Defender Abdulsalam Mohammed. He will wear the number 77 shirt. On the same day, Al Ain also announced that Kembo Ekoko will stay and will be  the last foreign player. Later on the day, Mirel Rădoi moved to Al Ain rivals Al Ahli after end of his contract at the end of the 2013–14 season. Al Ain camp was supposed to be in Erzurum, Turkey. Due to bad weather they moved to Montecatini, Italy. On 11 July, Al Ain began its pre-season campaign against Italy 3rd Division side Montecatini FC. Al Ain won 2–0, goals coming from Faris Jumaa and Ibrahim Diaky, assisted by Bandar Al Ahbabi. On 14 July, Al Ain won in its second pre-season match against Folgore Falciano, with a 1–7, goals coming from a brace by Ryan Yslam and goals from Ibrahim Diaky, Mohamed Ahmed, Miroslav Stoch, Rashed Eisa and Khalid Khalfan. On 15 July, goalkeeper Yousif Abdelrahman moved to Fujairah for two seasons. On 17 July, Asamoah Gyan awarded Al Hadath Al Riyadi's golden boot for the third time in a row, After he scored 29 goals in 26 match in league. On 18 July, Al Ain beat Barnsley 2–1 in its third pre-season match, a brace by Kembo Ekoko. On 23 July, Al Ain played their fifth pre-season match in the Al Ain International Championship against Kuwait at the Sheikh Khalifa International Stadium in Al Ain. The match ended 4–0, coming from a brace by Kembo Ekoko and goals from Miroslav Stoch, Mohamed Abdulrahman. Kembo Ekoko named man of the match. On 24 July, Asamoah Gyan extending contract until 2018. Gyan joined Al Ain in 2011 from Sunderland  on one season loan. On 6 July 2012 signed a five-year contract with club. He scored 103 goals in 92 match. Become Al Ain second top scorers in all competitions behind Ahmed Abdullah with 180. On 25 July, Al Ain won Al Ain International Championship in their sixth pre-season match after a draw with Al Nassr 1–1,  with Al Ain only goal coming from Kembo Ekoko in the 72nd minute. Ahmed Barman named man of the match. Kembo Ekoko was top scorer of the Championship for scoring three goals.  After the match Al Ain honored Asamoah Gyan as the top African goalscorer in the World Cup. He also ranked 35 on Goal 50 best footballers of the 2013–14 season, ahead of Paul Pogba and Robin van Persie. On 30 July, Al Ain announced renewed the contracts of four players Ahmed Barman, Mohamad Busanda, Saeed Mosabah, and Khalid Khalfan for long term contracts.

August
On 5 August, Al Ain lose from Catania 0–3 in its sixth pre-season match. On 6 August, Faraj Juma moved on a 1-year loan deal to club Al Shaab. On 8 August, Al Ain win 2–1, in its seventh pre-season match against Al Wahda, a penalty goal from Asamoah Gyan and a second goal from Mohamed Abdulrahman. On 11 August, Al Ain win 1–0 in its last pre-season match against Moroccan club Raja Casablanca. The only goal coming from Asamoah Gyan in the 85th minute.

Players

First team squad

From the youth squad

Players in / out

Club

Current technical staff

Other information

Statistics

Squad, appearances and goals

Squad Stats
{|class="wikitable" style="text-align: center;"
|-
!
! style="width:70px;"|League
! style="width:70px;"|Asia
! style="width:70px;"|Cup
! style="width:70px;"|League Cup
! style="width:70px;"|Super cup
! style="width:70px;"|Total Stats
|-
|align=left| Games played          || 6 || 4 || 0 || 2 || 0 || 12
|-
|align=left| Games won             || 4 || 3 || 0 || 0 || 0 || 7
|-
|align=left| Games drawn           || 1 || 0 || 0 || 0 || 0 || 1
|-
|align=left| Games lost            || 1 || 1 || 0 || 2 || 0 || 4
|-
|align=left| Goals for             || 15 || 7 || 0 || 1 || 0 || 23
|-
|align=left| Goals against         || 7 || 5 || 0 || 4 || 0 || 16
|-
|align=left| Goal by Substitute    || 1 || 1 || 0 || 0 || 0 || 2
|-
|align=left| Players used          || 84 || 56 || 0 || 28 || 0 || 168
|-
|align=left| Yellow cards          || 11 || 4 || 0 || 3 || 0 || 18
|-
|align=left| Red cards             || 1 || 2 || 0 || 0 || 0 || 3
|-

Goalscorers

Last updated:  6 November 2014

Assists

Last updated:  27 October 2014

Disciplinary record

Pre-season and friendlies

Goals and assists

Competitions

Overall

UAE Arabian Gulf Super Cup

UAE Pro-League

League table

Results summary

Results by round

Matches

President's Cup

UAE Arabian Gulf Cup

Group A

Matches

Last updated: 6 November 2014Source: AGLeague.ae

AFC Champions League

Group stage

Group B

Knockout phase

Round of 16

3–3 on aggregate. Al-Ahli won on away goals.

References

External links
 Al Ain FC official website 

2014-15
Emirati football clubs 2014–15 seasons